The Singapore Racecourse/ Singapore Turf Club is a venue for thoroughbred horse racing, situated in Kranji, next to the Kranji MRT station. Built and operated by the Singapore Turf Club, it opened on 4 March 2000, replacing the Bukit Timah Race Course.

The Singapore Turf Club has hosted a number of important domestic races as well as two major international events, the Singapore Airlines International Cup and the KrisFlyer International Sprint.

References
 Race details at the Singapore Turf Club official website.

Horse racing venues in Singapore